Events from the year 1538 in France

Incumbents
 Monarch – Francis I

Events
June 18 – Truce of Nice: Peace is declared between Emperor Charles V and Francis I of France.

Births

July 25 – Diane de France, duchess (died 1619)

Full date missing
Guillaume de Baillou, physician (died 1616)
Nicolas Barnaud, writer, physician and alchemist (died 1604)
François de Bar, monk and scholar (died 1606)
Amadis Jamyn, poet (died 1593)

Deaths
October – Maistre Jhan, composer (born c.1485)

See also

References

1530s in France